Lviv or Lwów pogrom may refer to:
Lwów pogrom (1914)
Lwów pogrom (1918)
Lviv pogroms (1941)